Gholamreza Ansari may also refer to:
 Gholamreza Ansari (born 1955) (fa), Iranian diplomat
 Gholamreza Ansari (born 1956), Iranian politician